Draginja "Draga" Obrenović (11 September 1867 – ), formerly Mašin (Машин), was the Queen consort of Serbia as the wife of King Aleksandar Obrenović. She was formerly a lady-in-waiting to Aleksandar's mother, Queen Natalija (until 1897).

Early life 

Draga was the fourth daughter of Panta Lunjevica, a prefect of the Aranđelovac area, and wife Anđelija (née Koljević). Draga was the sixth of seven siblings. She had two brothers, Nikola and Nikodije, and four sisters, Hristina, Đina, Ana and Vojka. Draga's mother was a dipsomaniac and her father died in a lunatic asylum.

Draga was the granddaughter of Nikola Lunjevica, a relative of Princess Ljubica of Serbia and close comrade of Prince Miloš, her husband's great-granduncle. Her paternal grandmother was Đurđija Čarapić, a relative of vojvoda Ilija Čarapić (died 1844), husband of Karađorđe Petrović's daughter Stamenka Karađorđević. 

At the age of nine, Draga was sent to school in Belgrade, where she completed her school-education. Then she attended the "Cermanka's Institute" or "Women's Institute". There she learned several foreign languages, including Russian, French and German. During her stay in Belgrade, Draga began to write novels and short stories and to translate books for money. Despite the fact that the father took a lot of care about her, she began to earn her living as a very young girl. She even published some interesting stories for foreign journals. She liked to read and especially liked to read Stendhal. At the time of her second marriage, she was the widow of Svetozar Mašin (1851-1886), a Czech civil engineer, son of Jan Mašin, who served as the royal physician to King Milan, her future father in law. She married Svetozar in August 1883 in the Cathedral Church of Belgrade.

Queen

Despite Draga being ten years older than Aleksandar, the couple married on 5 August 1900 in a formal ceremony. When Aleksandar announced their engagement, public opinion turned against him. He was viewed as a besotted young fool in the power of a wicked seductress. Dowager Queen Natalija bitterly opposed the marriage, and was exiled by her son, in part because of it. His many arbitrary and unpopular acts were blamed on Draga's influence. There were rumors that Aleksandar would name Draga's elder brother as heir-presumptive to the throne. Both brothers were serving as army officers at the time of the marriage and appear to have been unpopular with their peers.

The Queen Draga of Serbia's Decoration was instituted in her honour on 7 April 1902. This medal was awarded to ladies for "achieving meritorious charitable work.”

Assassination
 
The rumour concerning the royal succession led to the couple's assassination. On the night of 10–11 June 1903, a group of army officers invaded the royal palace, led by Colonel Dragutin Dimitrijević and others. Troops led by other officers involved in the conspiracy were deployed near the palace, and the royal guards did not offer effective resistance during the confusion after the electric lighting of the building was turned off. Initially the conspirators were unable to find Aleksandar and Draga. However an aide of the king was captured and, either out of sympathy for the conspiracy or out of fear for his own life, revealed that they were hiding in a large built-in wardrobe off their bedroom. 

Another account says that Aleksandar did not shut the secret door properly. Emerging partially dressed, the couple were murdered with sword thrusts and pistol shots by the officers, some of whom were reportedly drunk. The bodies were mutilated and afterwards thrown from a palace balcony onto piles of garden manure.  Draga's two brothers, Nikodije and Nikola, were executed by firing squad on the same day.

Portrayals

Draga Mašin was played by Magda Sonja in the 1920 Austrian silent film Queen Draga. In the 1932 American film A Woman Commands she was portrayed by Pola Negri. She was also played by Ljiljana Blagojević in the 1995 Serbian mini-series The End of Obrenović Dynasty.

Honours
National honours
  Dame Grand Cross of the Order of Miloš the Great (5 August 1900).
  Dame Grand Cross of the Order of the White Eagle (5 August 1900).

Annotations

References

Sources

External links

1864 births
1903 deaths
1903 murders in Europe
19th-century Serbian royalty
20th-century Serbian royalty
19th-century Serbian women
20th-century Serbian women
Yugoslav queens consort
Obrenović dynasty
People from Gornji Milanovac
Assassinated Serbian people
People executed by defenestration
Murdered Serbian royalty
People murdered in Serbia
Deaths by firearm in Serbia
Burials at St. Mark's Church, Belgrade
Female murder victims